Patrick Côté may refer to:

Patrick Côté (fighter) (born 1980), Canadian MMA fighter
Patrick Côté (ice hockey) (born 1975), Canadian hockey player
Patrick Côté (biathlete) (born 1985), Canadian biathlete